Mani Koya Kurup is a 1979 Indian Malayalam-language film,  directed by S. S. Devadas and produced by P. P. Jose. The film stars Alummoodan, Jayakala, K. P. Ummer Kuthiravattam Pappu and Padmapriya. The film has musical score by M. S. Viswanathan.

Cast
K. P. Ummer
Vincent
Alummoodan
Kuthiravattam Pappu
Lalu Alex
Thikkurissy Sukumaran Nair
Jayamalini
Padmapriya
Philomina
Sadhana
Geetha Salam

Soundtrack
The music was composed by M. S. Viswanathan and the lyrics were written by P. Bhaskaran.

References

External links
 

1979 films
1970s Malayalam-language films
Films scored by M. S. Viswanathan